The Chebeague Island Inn is located on Chebeague Island, Maine, United States. It also overlooks a few holes of the island's nine-hole golf course.

The inn, which has twenty-six rooms, was built in the 1880s, and was originally known as the Hillcrest Hotel. The inn burned down in the early 20th century and was rebuilt in the 1920s. It was given its current name in 2000, and was fully renovated in 2004.

References

External links 

 

Hotels established in the 1880s
Hotels in Cumberland County, Maine
Chebeague Island, Maine
1880s establishments in Maine